Actinoconchus is an extinct genus of brachiopods that lived from the Carboniferous to the Late Permian in Africa, Asia, Europe, and North America.

Sources
 Fossils (Smithsonian Handbooks) by David Ward (Page 85)

External links
Actinoconchus in the Paleobiology Database

Prehistoric brachiopod genera
Spiriferida
Carboniferous brachiopods
Permian brachiopods
Paleozoic brachiopods of Africa
Paleozoic brachiopods of Asia
Paleozoic brachiopods of Europe
Paleozoic brachiopods of North America
Carboniferous first appearances
Lopingian genus extinctions